ChessTV or Mitt i Schack (the original Swedish title) is a TV show in Sweden regarding chess. The show aired between 2 August 2004 and 3 June 2013, running for 391 episodes.

The show was aired on the following channels:

The show 

The idea behind WCN was to spread chess news all over the world, to show chess players that the effort they put into chess is noticed, and to show non‐chess players that chess inspires and engages all kinds of people: chess is so much more than just an ancient board game. WCN was started as a protest to the negligence of chess by the Swedish media, and was run by a non‐profit organization, dependent on donations. The show was produced by Adriana, Antonia and Amelia Krzymowska, and Alfred and Albert Krzymowski, who together created the idea and concept.

Cast
 Adriana Krzymowska
 Antonia Krzymowska 
 Amelia Krzymowska 
 Alfred Krzymowski
 Albert Krzymowski 
 Arne Johansson 
 Bo Kyhle

References

Dagens Industri 2009-12-30

Realtid.se 2009-12-21

Realtid.se 2009-12-04

External links
 

Swedish documentary television series
Chess in Sweden
2004 Swedish television series debuts
2013 Swedish television series endings